The World Golf Teachers Federation (WGTF) is the umbrella body of various golf teaching federations around the world.  Founded in 1993 as a collaboration between the United States Golf Teachers Federation and Europe, the WGTF has expanded to include 41 member federations.  The WGTF provides an international standard for the training and certification of golf teaching professionals, and is the largest organization of golf teaching professionals worldwide.

World Golf Teachers Cup
The World Golf Teachers Cup is the world championship event of the World Golf Teachers Federation.  Since 2001, it has been played biennially in different locations around the world. Prior to 2001, it was an annual event. Competition consists of both team and individual championships.

Past team champions

2019 United States
2017 United States
2015 Brazil
2013 China
2011 United States
2009 United States
2007 Caribbean
2005 Paraguay
2003 United States
2001 United States
2000 Europe
1999 United States
1998 United States
1997 United States

Past individual champions

2019 Mark Harman
2017 Shafiq Masih
2015 Rebecca Samuelsson
2013 Makoto Kitagawa
2011 James Douris
2009 Luis Menezes
2007 Christopher Richards
2005 Raul Fretes
2003 David Belling
2001 Henrik Jentsch
2000 Doug Borland
1999 Ken Butler
1998 Mark Harman
1997 Mark Harman

References

External links

World Golf Teachers Cup

Golf associations
Golf instruction
Coaching associations
Non-profit organizations based in Florida
International organizations based in the United States
Sports organizations established in 1993
1993 establishments in the United States